Platte Valley Airpark  is a public-use airport three miles northwest of Hudson, in Weld County, Colorado, United States.

Facilities
 15/33: 4,100 x 40 ft (1,250 x 12 m): asphalt
 9/27: 2,500 x 90 ft (762 x 27 m): turf/gravel

In 2005 the airport had 4,100 aircraft operations, average 11 per day: 98% general aviation and 2% military. 78 aircraft are based at this airport: 96% single engine and 4% multi-engine.

Data

Navigation
VOR 114.7 (MILE HIGH) .... GPS no .... ILS no

Runway
Lights MIRL .... VGSI none .... App Lgts none .... Taxiway dirt soft when wet

Communication
CTAF/UNICOM 122.9 .... Lights 122.9 and 5 clicks

Contact information
Facility manager phone 303-536-0380

Services
TSNT Storage hangars and tiedowns
Fuel 100LL, MOGAS, and self-service, 24-hour credit card
Public phone and computerized WX planning in FBO
Aircraft and hangar rentals
Instructional services

Accidents and incidents
On September 18, 2022, a Sonex airplane that took off from the air-park with one person, its pilot, collided in Boulder County with a Cessna 172 that had taken off from the Rocky Mountain Airport with two persons on board, its pilot in-training and a teacher pilot. Both airplanes crashed and were destroyed on impact, killing all three people on board them.

See also 
Vintage Aero Flying Museum
Local Commemorative Air Force unit

References 

 2007-2008 Colorado Airport Directory, Colorado Division of Aeronautics, CDOT, 5126 Front Range Parkway, Watkins, Colorado, 80137

External links
 Platte Valley Airpark (18V) at Colorado DOT airport directory
 

Airports in Colorado
Transportation buildings and structures in Weld County, Colorado